Granitehill Lake Water Aerodrome  is located  west southwest of Hornepayne, Ontario, Canada.

References

Registered aerodromes in Algoma District
Seaplane bases in Ontario